Skapinker is a surname. Notable people with the surname include:

Mark Skapinker, South African-born Canadian venture capitalist
Michael Skapinker (born 1955), South African journalist